Clement John (born 29 March 1941) is a former cricketer and senior civil servant from Dominica.

Cricket career
Clem John was a middle-order batsman who played first-class cricket for the Windward Islands and the Combined Islands from 1961 to 1969. He was the Windward Islands’ best batsman in their match against the touring Australians in 1965, scoring 77 and 27. 

He captained the Combined Islands in the inaugural season of the Shell Shield in 1965–66. After drawing their first two matches and losing their third, they beat Trinidad in their fourth match, John making 94, the highest score on either side in the match.

Later life
After his playing career was over, John served as a selector for the Dominica cricket team for 10 years. A cricket stand at Windsor Park Stadium in Roseau is named in his honour – the Clem John and Kelleb Laurent Stand. He was awarded the Sisserou Award of Honour in 2002, and was inducted into the Dominica Cricket Hall of Fame in 2010.

John was Dominica’s Chief Elections Officer from 1982 to 2000 and was Chairman of the Justice Committee of Prisons and a member of the Public Service Appeal Board. He was an election observer for the Organization of American States and CARICOM and served on their supervisory bodies for several Caribbean elections.

The Windward Islands cricketer Jerlani Robinson is his grandson.

References

External links 
 

1941 births
Living people
People from Roseau
Combined Islands cricketers
Windward Islands cricketers
Dominica cricketers 
Dominica civil servants